The Kajang Hospital is a government-funded district hospital located in Kajang, Hulu Langat District,
Selangor, Malaysia.

History
The hospital was initially founded in 1889 with the founding of the town.

The hospital grew with the development of Kajang town and Hulu Langat district. The hospital had 250 beds in the 1970s and this has increased to 306 beds currently.

The hospital has gradually increased its number of buildings. The first permanent building which still stands until now was constructed in 1910. Another 4-storey block was added in 1976. Other blocks later added include the Food preparation block (1983), the morgue (1985) and the pathology unit (1992).

The latest building addition was carried out under the Hospital Redevelopment Project Phase 2, which was completed in 1999. The construction cost RM14.1 million and was funded by the Asian Development Bank. The building consists of 1st and 2nd class labour wards (22 beds), neonatal unit (20 beds), Operating Theatre block (2 theatres), Intensive Care Unit (6 beds), Paediatric block (22 beds) and the rehabilitation block.

The hospital also has a hemodialysis unit which was started in 2000.

Administration
The hospital is managed by a Director, who is assisted by the management and services unit. The director reports to the State Health Deputy Director (Medical services) and the Selangor State Health Director.

The hospital has 13 departments and 12 units. It received the MS ISO 9001:2000 certification on 11 November 2005.

References

External links
 Official Website

Hospital buildings completed in 1910
Hospital buildings completed in 1976
Hospitals in Selangor
Hospital